Proposition 57 may refer to:

 California Proposition 57 (2004), the Economic Recovery Bond Act
 California Proposition 57 (2016), prison reform proposition